Jirga is an assembly or council of Pashtun and Afghan leaders that makes decisions by consensus.

Jirga may also refer to:

Politics
Meshrano Jirga ("Elders' Jirga"), the upper house of the Afghan legislature
Wolesi Jirga, ("People's Jirga"), the lower house of the Afghan legislature
Pashtun National Jirga, held to discuss the critical issues faced by the Pashtuns in Pakistan
All India Pakhtoon Jirga-e-Hind, organisation representing the interests of Pashtuns in India

Films
Jirga (film), 2008 Australian film

Television
Jirga with Saleem Safi, current affairs talk show on Geo News

Places
Day Mirdad District or Jilga District, Wardak Province, Afghanistan
Jirgah, village in Lorestan Province, Iran